Henry de Jouvenel des Ursins (5 April 1876 – 5 October 1935) was a French journalist and statesman. He became the French High Commissioner in Syria and Lebanon on 23 December 1925 until 23 June 1926.

Personal life
Henry de Jouvenel was born into a middle-class family of lawyers and politicians. He was educated at the prestigious Collège Stanislas de Paris. According to his biographer Rudolph Binion:
Henry de Jouvenel never outgrew the spirit of his schooldays -- his humanism, his enthusiasm for ideas, the original blend of audacity and courtesy in his thinking, his dream of detecting and expressing unanimity amid discord. He matured, not by putting these things aside, but by adding to them.

Jouvenel's first wife was Sarah Boas, the daughter of a Jewish industrialist.  They had a son, Bertrand de Jouvenel, in 1903. Henri divorced Sarah in 1912. That same year he married the novelist Sidonie-Gabrielle Colette. The couple had one daughter, Colette de Jouvenel, known to the family as Bel-Gazou ("beautiful babbling/chirping" in local dialect). They divorced in 1924 after Colette became involved romantically with Henry's son Bertrand. This affair became the subject of Colette's novel Le Blé en Herbe ("Green Wheat").

He is the brother of French journalist Robert de Jouvenel.

See also 
 High Commissioner
 French Mandate for Syria and the Lebanon

References

Further reading
 Rudolph Binion. Defeated Leaders: The Political Fate of Caillaux, Jouvenel, and Tardieu (1960) online pp. 119–97

External links
 

French Ministers of Overseas France
Ambassadors of France to Italy
Collège Stanislas de Paris alumni
1876 births
1935 deaths
People of the Great Syrian Revolt
Senators of Corrèze
High Commissioners of the Levant